No. 23 Squadron was a squadron of the Royal New Zealand Air Force. It was formed in August 1944 at RNZAF Station Ardmore equipped with the F4U-1 Corsair fighter bomber.

History
The squadron was established at RNZAF Ardmore in August 1944. It moved to Palikulo Bay Airfield on Espiritu Santo to continue training in September. In late October 1944 it moved to Kukum Field on Guadalcanal, where it flew ground attack missions on Bougainville targeting Japanese positions until 14 November. In late November 1944, it moved to Momote Field on Los Negros Island where it flew combat air patrols in defence of the island. In February 1945, the squadron moved to Guadalcanal and then to Emirau from March–May and then to Piva Airfield on Bougainville from June–October 1945.

Commanding officers
Squadron Leader J. J. de Willimoff: August 1944 – May 1945
Squadron Leader D. E. Hogan: May–October 1945

References

Further reading
Owen, R.E. Official History of New Zealand in the Second World War 1939–45, Government Printer, Wellington, New Zealand, 1955

23
Military units and formations established in 1944
Military units and formations disestablished in 1945
Squadrons of the RNZAF in World War II